Nanuza is a plant genus in the family Velloziaceae, described as a genus in 1976. The entire genus is endemic to Brazil.

 Species
 Nanuza almeidae R.J.V.Alves - Bahia, Espirito Santo, Rio de Janeiro
 Nanuza luetzelburgii R.J.V.Alves - Pernambuco, Piauí
 Nanuza plicata (Mart.) L.B.Sm. & Ayensu - Espírito Santo, Bahia, Minas Gerais

References

External links 

Velloziaceae
Pandanales genera
Endemic flora of Brazil